Cosmos is a city in Meeker County, Minnesota, United States, along the South Fork of the Crow River.  The population was 473 at the 2010 census.

History 
The first settlers arrived in the area of present-day Cosmos in the late 1860s. Pioneer Daniel Hoyt is credited with the name as Cosmos “represents the university of created things and its synonym is harmony.”

Sometime around 1910, it was rumored the railroad was coming through Cosmos and the hamlet saw a surge in new businesses. It wasn’t until 1922 that the railroad did arrive. Once again, Cosmos saw the start of many new businesses as the Luce Railroad arrived. Today the Luce Line Trail runs from Cosmos to Minneapolis.

While the town had been organized in 1870, it wasn’t officially incorporated as a village until 1926.

Geography

Cosmos is located along the South Fork of the Crow River.  Minnesota State Highways 4 (Milky Way Street) and 7 (Astro Blvd.) are the two main routes in the town.  The space theme extends to other streets which are named after planets or constellations.

Space Festival
On the third weekend in July, the city holds the Cosmos Space Festival. It features Minn-E-Rods, a softball tournament, a volleyball tournament, an antique tractor pull, meals in the park, pig races, a Space Festival parade, fireworks, a pancake breakfast, a pork chop dinner, church in the park, music entertainment, crafters, a pedal tractor pull, a disc golf tournament, laser tag, a bean bag tournament, citywide garage sales, drawings, and many other activities.

Demographics

2010 census
As of the census of 2010, there were 473 people, 229 households, and 120 families residing in the city. The racial makeup of the city was 97.5% White, 0.2% African American, 0.2% Native American, 0.2% Pacific Islander, 1.5% from other races, and 0.4% from two or more races. Hispanic or Latino of any race were 1.7% of the population.

There were 229 households, of which 23.6% had children under the age of 18 living with them, 38.9% were married couples living together, 10.9% had a female householder with no husband present, 2.6% had a male householder with no wife present, and 47.6% were non-families. 38.0% of all households were made up of individuals, and 14.9% had someone living alone who was 65 years of age or older. The average household size was 2.07 and the average family size was 2.78.

The median age in the city was 45.2 years. 19.9% of residents were under the age of 18; 6.8% were between the ages of 18 and 24; 23.3% were from 25 to 44; 30.7% were from 45 to 64, and 19.5% were 65 years of age or older. The gender makeup of the city was 49.0% male and 51.0% female.

2000 census
As of the census of 2000, there were 582 people, 240 households, and 154 families residing in the city. The racial makeup of the city was 98.28% White. Four persons (0.69%) identified as Asian, one (0.17%) as Pacific Islander, two (0.34%) from other races, and three (0.52%) from two or more races. Two persons (0.34%) were Hispanic or Latino of any race.

There were 240 households, out of which 27.5% had children under the age of 18 living with them, 52.5% were married couples living together, 8.3% had a female householder with no husband present, and 35.8% were non-families. 28.8% of all households were made up of individuals, and 11.3% had someone living alone who was 65 years of age or older.  The average household size was 2.26 and the average family size was 2.73.

In the city, the population was spread out, with 20.8% under the age of 18, 7.9% from 18 to 24, 26.8% from 25 to 44, 21.1% from 45 to 64, and 23.4% who were 65 years of age or older.  The median age was 42 years. For every 100 females, there were 90.8 males.  For every 100 females age 18 and over, there were 90.5 males.

The median income for a household in the city was $30,278, and the median income for a family was $36,750. Males had a median income of $31,364 versus $23,125 for females. The per capita income for the city was $15,447.  About 5.8% of families and 10.0% of the population were below the poverty line, including 4.1% of those under age 18 and 22.0% of those age 65 or over.

Notable people
Mary Jane Shultz, professor and researcher in physical, environmental, materials and surface chemistry

Notes

External links
 City Website

Cities in Minnesota
Cities in Meeker County, Minnesota